Lahran (also Romanized as Lahrān) is a village in Pain Taleqan Rural District, in the Central District of Taleqan County, Alborz Province, Iran. At the 2006 census, its population was 39, in 20 families.

References 

Populated places in Taleqan County